Ambre Allinckx (born 26 March 2002 in Lucerne) is a Swiss professional squash player. As of January 2021, she was ranked number 68 in the world.

References

2002 births
Living people
Swiss female squash players
French female squash players
Sportspeople from Lucerne